Davide Bariti (born 7 July 1991) is an Italian footballer who plays as a midfielder for  club Pergolettese.

Club career

Carrarese
Born in La Spezia, Liguria, Bariti started his career at nearby Tuscan team Carrarese. He was the member of Allievi B U16 team in 2006–07 season. In January 2009 Bariti made his first team debut.

Triestina
On 31 August 2009 Triestina signed Bariti in co-ownership deal for €150,000 and sent him back to Lega Pro Seconda Divisione. In June 2010 Triestina bought Bariti outright for an undisclosed free. Bariti played 22 games (5 starts) for Triestina in 2010–11 Serie B. The team relegated at the end of season.

Bariti played the first two rounds of 2011–12 Coppa Italia before leaving Triestina. He scored the 1st and 11th kick of Triestina in the penalty shootout.

Vicenza
On 31 August 2011 Triestina sold Bariti to Vicenza for free (along with Marco Franceschin for undisclosed fee) and the club re-sold half of the registration rights of Bariti to Napoli, for €550,000 in 3-year deal. On the same day Bariti returned to the city of Vicenza for 2011–12 Serie B.

Napoli 
On 22 June 2012 Napoli acquired Bariti outright after Vicenza were also relegated. However, Vicenza would only receive half of the "card" of Mario Sgambato as compensation. On 31 August 2012, Bariti was loaned out to Lega Pro Prima Divisione club Avellino.

In 2013–14 Serie A Bariti was a player for Napoli's first team. He made two appearances.

Lupa Roma
In 2014 Bariti was released by Napoli. He was signed by Lega Pro club Lupa Roma.

Sicula Leonzio
On 10 August 2019, he signed a two-year contract with Sicula Leonzio.

Pergolettese
On 10 October 2020, he joined to Pergolettese.

International career
Bariti played against Slovakia and Slovenia in 2008–09 Mirop Cup for Italy U20 Lega Pro team in April and November 2009. He also played the next match, against Malta in 2009–11 International Challenge Trophy in December 2009. Bariti also played for Italy U20 lega Pro in 2009 and 2010 Trofeo Dossena, winning New York Magic (men S-20 team) and the youth team of Internacional in the final respectively.

Bariti played once for the Italy U20 A team in the last match of 2010–11 Four Nations Tournament, in June 2011.

In January 2012 Bariti received his first U21 call-up, for a training camp in Rome.

Notes

References

External links
 FIGC 
 Football.it Profile 

1991 births
Living people
People from La Spezia
Sportspeople from the Province of La Spezia
Italian footballers
Association football midfielders
Serie A players
Serie B players
Serie C players
Carrarese Calcio players
U.S. Triestina Calcio 1918 players
L.R. Vicenza players
S.S.C. Napoli players
U.S. Avellino 1912 players
Lupa Roma F.C. players
Rimini F.C. 1912 players
U.S. Ancona 1905 players
A.S.D. Sicula Leonzio players
U.S. Pergolettese 1932 players
Italy youth international footballers